Devosia insulae is a Gram-negative, non-spore-forming motile bacteria from the genus of Devosia with a single flagellum. It was first isolated from soil samples collected in Dokdo, in the Republic of Korea.

References

External links
Type strain of Devosia insulae at BacDive -  the Bacterial Diversity Metadatabase

Hyphomicrobiales
Bacteria described in 2007